Distracción is a town and municipality in the Colombian Department of La Guajira. Founded in 1845 by a man from neighboring Barrancas named Antonio María Vidal on the right margin of the Ranchería River.

The town celebrates the Festival de los Laureles (Spanish for Festival of the Laurels). The town's economy relies mostly in agriculture, farming and the rudimentary exploitation of a limestone mine.

Geography

The municipality of Distracción is located in the Guajira Peninsula, on the Valley of Upar formed by the mountains of the Sierra Nevada de Santa Marta and Serranía del Perijá. It has a total area of 220 km² bordering to the north with the municipality of Riohacha; to the east with the municipality of Fonseca; to the south with the municipalities of San Juan del Cesar and Fonseca and to the west with the municipality of San Juan del Cesar.

Politics

Defense

The Colombian National Army has two major units in the department part of the 1st Division one of these is the 2nd Mechanized Cavalry Battalion also known as the Batallon Rondon.

References

External links
 Gobernacion de La Guajira - Distraccion
 Distraccion official website

Municipalities of La Guajira Department